"Papa Pingouin" ("Poppa/Daddy Penguin") was the  entry in the Eurovision Song Contest 1980, performed in French by the French twin sisters Sophie & Magaly.

First version
The singers describe his desire to fly like a seagull and travel around the world, listing various places he visits in his imagination.

The song ends with the penguin's realisation that life "on the ice floe" is not as bad as he had thought, so he "burns his suitcase" to signify that his desire to travel is over. Sophie & Magaly also recorded a German-language version of the song, "Papa Pinguin".

The song was performed fourth on the night, following 's Anna Vissi And The Epikouri with "Autostop" and preceding 's Samira with "Bitaqat Hub". At the close of voting, it had received 56 points, placing 9th in a field of 19.

It was succeeded as Luxembourgish representative at the 1981 contest by Jean-Claude Pascal with "C'est peut-être pas l'Amérique".

The "Ralph Siegel" scandal
When Sophie and Magaly Gilles, the original singers, signed with Ralph Siegel, they were still minors and their parents were not aware of some of the "practices" in the entertainment industry. Ralph Siegel signed a contract with the parents that gave the sisters only a small percentage of sales.

In April 1982, the twins appeared on the French primetime television programme Droit de Réponse (TF1), and publicly reported that they each received only €5,000 for selling more than one million copies of their singles. They also stated that Ralph Siegel had decided not to work with the girls anymore and did not want to renegotiate their contracts. He claimed that the original contract was valid and that nothing could be done against him.

In 2003, Jean-Paul Cara, one of the French songwriters, confirmed that Siegel never intended for Sophie and Magaly to be a successful group. He just needed twin singers for this particular song.

Magaly died in 1996 of HIV-AIDS. Sophie suffered from high depressive syndrome and lived a secluded life in the South of France until her death in 2019.

Pigloo version

A remake of this song performed by animated penguin Pigloo became a hit in France in 2006, reaching number one on the SNEP Singles Chart for three weeks. The single remained on the chart for 27 weeks, becoming the fifth-best-selling single in France that year. The song also charted on Swiss Singles Chart, where it peaked at number 24. A German version title "Papa Pinguin" also charted in German-speaking Europe, reaching number four in Austria and number six in both Germany and Switzerland.

Formats and track listings
CD single
 "Le Papa pingouin" — 3:09
 "Les Manchots et les Pingouins" (instrumental) — 3:12

Digital download
 "Le Papa pingouin" — 3:09

Charts

Weekly charts
"Le Papa Pingouin"

"Papa Pinguin"

Year-end charts
"Le Papa Pingouin"

"Papa Pinguin"

Certifications and sales

|}

External links
 Official Eurovision Song Contest site, history by year, 1980
 Detailed info & lyrics, The Diggiloo Thrush, "Papa Pingouin"
 ESCtoday.com, The Sad Life Story of Sophie & Magaly
 Bide-et-musique.com, Sophie & Magaly

References

1980 songs
2006 singles
2007 singles
Eurovision songs of Luxembourg
Eurovision songs of 1980
SNEP Top Singles number-one singles
Pigloo songs
Songs written by Ralph Siegel
Songs written by Bernd Meinunger
Songs written by Pierre Delanoë
Sony BMG singles
Songs about birds